John David is an American physician that is currently the Richard Pearson Strong Professor of Tropical Public Health, Emeritus at Harvard School of Public Health.  David earned his medical degree at the University of Chicago.

References

Year of birth missing (living people)
Living people
Harvard School of Public Health faculty
American tropical physicians
Pritzker School of Medicine alumni
Members of the National Academy of Medicine